St. Margaret of Cortona's Church is a parish church under the authority of the Roman Catholic Archdiocese of New York, located at 6000 Riverdale Avenue, Riverdale-on-Hudson, The Bronx, New York City, New York.

Parish history
Prior to 1887, Catholics in the Riverdale section of the Bronx attended either St. John's in Kingsbridge or St. Mary's in Yonkers. The parish was established in 1887 by the Rev. James F. Kiley, with initial services being held in St. Vincent's Free School (now Le Gras Hall on the Campus of Mount Saint Vincent College). The first permanent church was erected on the Southeast corner of Riverdale Avenue and West 260th Street and dedicated August 16, 1891 by Archbishop Corrigan. Fr. Kiely was succeeded as pastor by the Rev. Michael J. Murray, who also attended to the Visitation Convent chapel in the parish.

The current church and rectory were built in 1964 on the Northeast corner of Riverdale and West 260th Street; the new church was dedicated in June 1965.

in 2015, the parish of St. Gabriel's merged with St. Margaret's.

St. Margaret's Parish School
In 1875 the Sisters of Charity opened St. Vincent's Free School on the grounds of Mount St. Vincent for the children of the Irish poor, who worked as domestics on the numerous estates that populated Riverdale at the time.

In 1910 Fr. Murray built a school, called Lavelle Hall, but because of financial restraints, could not open it when built. Instead it was leased to the New York City School system in September 1915.  When the building of P.S. 81 was completed in 1926, then pastor, Rev. Thomas J. Doyle opened the parish school in September 1926. In 1915, the congregation numbered "464 men, women and children."

Pastors
 Rev. James F. Kiley (1890-1905), "founder and first rector"
 Rev. Michael J. Murray (1905-1919), assisted by the Rev. Edward J. Holden
 Rev. James Aylward (1919-1925)
 Rev. Joseph Doyle, (Later Monsignor Doyle) (1925-1962)
 Rev. Kilcoyne (late 1950s)
 Monsignor William Foley, -2008
 Rev. Brian McCarthy, 2008 -

References 

History of St. Margaret of Cortona parish, researched and written by Kevin T. O'Reilly on the occasion of the 100th Anniversary of the parish

Religious organizations established in 1890
Roman Catholic churches completed in 1891
Roman Catholic churches in the Bronx
19th-century Roman Catholic church buildings in the United States
Riverdale, Bronx